Grilled cheese may refer to:

 Grilled cheese sandwich
 Cheeses that are grilled or fried by themselves, including:
 Halloumi
 Saganaki
 Leipäjuusto
Grilled Cheese aspiration, a punitive game mechanic in The Sims 2: Nightlife

See also
Fried cheese